Frozen is a 2010 American psychological survival horror film written and directed by Adam Green, and starring Shawn Ashmore, Kevin Zegers, and introducing Emma Bell in her film debut. It tells the story of three friends stranded in a chairlift after a day of skiing, forced to make life-or-death choices in order to survive and get down.

The film was met with mixed reviews, and was followed by Hatchet II (released seven months after Frozen), with Bell reprising her role in a scene serving as an epilogue to the events of Frozen.

Plot
Dan Walker, his girlfriend Parker O'Neal, and his best friend Joe Lynch, travel to a ski resort to enjoy a day on the slopes. Before departing, the three friends convince the ski lift operator to let them go on one last run down the mountain before the resort closes for a long weekend. The ski lift operator gets relieved from duty by a second operator. The first operator tells the second one that there are three people who still needed to come down, but the second operator mistakes three mingling skiers for Dan, Parker and Joe and turns the ski lift off as the three friends dangle many feet above the ground.

Trapped on the ski lift chair, the trio argues over how to escape before Dan jumps off the chair in an attempt to get help. The fall breaks both of Dan's legs and he is subsequently attacked and killed by a pack of wolves while his friends watch helplessly.

Joe attempts to traverse the ski lift cable, making it onto a nearby support tower, but doing this causes the bolt holding the chair to the cable to become dangerously loose.

On the ground, the wolves have gathered below, waiting for Joe. After being attacked, he manages to scare them off using a ski pole and then slides down the mountain on Parker's snowboard, planning to return with help, but the wolves chase after him. Joe does not return by the next morning, so Parker attempts to reach the support pole herself. As she stands in the chair, the bolt fails and the lift falls to a few meters above the ground. Parker jumps from the chair, but the chair then falls and fractures her ankle.

Parker begins to slide and crawl down the mountain. She encounters the wolves feasting on Joe's mutilated corpse and, too occupied with eating, they ignore Parker as she continues down, eventually reaching a road. While a car passes without noticing her, another eventually appears and the driver stops. He drives her to a local hospital, telling her that she will be okay. Parker closes her eyes as she misses Dan and remembers him telling her that she will survive.

Cast
 Shawn Ashmore as Joe Lynch, Dan's best friend
 Kevin Zegers as Dan Walker, Joe's best friend
 Emma Bell as Parker O'Neal, Dan's girlfriend
 Rileah Vanderbilt as Shannon
 Ed Ackerman as Jason
 Adam Johnson as Rifkin
 Christopher York as Ryan
 Kane Hodder as Cody
 Will Barratt as Sullivan
 Adam Green as Guy on Chairlift #1
 Joe Lynch as Guy on Chairlift #2
 Peder Melhuse as Driver
 Cody Blue Snider as Twisted Sister fan in cafeteria

Production
Frozen was filmed at Snowbasin near Ogden, Utah, in February 2009 and distributed by Anchor Bay Entertainment.

Release
The film premiered at the 2010 Sundance Film Festival. It was released in North American theaters on February 5, 2010, with distribution from Anchor Bay Films.

While playing at Sundance, the film caused quite a stir with numerous faintings reported from audience members that could not handle the tension of the film. One such fainting happened at the Tower Theater in Salt Lake City. Frozen also opened the Glasgow FrightFest. On February 5, the film had multiple screens in areas in Boston, New York, Los Angeles, Salt Lake City, Dallas, Denver, Philadelphia, Minneapolis and Chicago.

The film premiered on February 5, 2010, with the entire cast and crew at Mann Chinese 6 on Hollywood Blvd. Frozen was released in Malaysia on June 24, 2010.

Box office
Frozen opened to a first weekend box office of $131,395. It underperformed the following weeks. Internationally, the film earned over $2.4 million, bringing its total gross receipts to slightly less than $2.7 million. At its widest domestic release, it screened in 106 theaters.

Home media
The film was released on a single disc DVD and Blu-ray on September 28, 2010. Bonus features include an audio commentary with writer/director Adam Green and the leads Shawn Ashmore, Kevin Zegers and Emma Bell; the documentaries "Catching Frostbite: The Origins of Frozen", "Three Below Zero", "Shooting Through It" and "Beating the Mountain: Surviving Frozen"; deleted scenes; and the official theatrical trailer. The Blu-ray features an exclusive commentary from Adam Green, cinematographer Will Barratt, and editor Ed Marx.

Soundtrack
A soundtrack album consisting of the film's complete score, composed by Andy Garfield was released by 2M1 Records Group in January 2011. It is available in a limited pressed run of 500 copies signed by Garfield and Adam Green. The album was produced by George Fox. Additionally, it has been released on iTunes and Amazon as a download.

Connection to Hatchet II

In Adam Green's subsequent film Hatchet II, released seven months after Frozen (also in 2010), Emma Bell appears in an uncredited cameo reprising her role as Parker O'Neal, in a scene serving as an epilogue to the main events of Frozen. In the scene, Parker is revealed to have successfully sued the ski resort for abandoning her, Dan, and Joe to the wolves, declaring that she will never go skiing again.

Reception

Critical response
Rotten Tomatoes reports that 63% of 97 critics gave the film a positive review, with an average rating of 5.8/10. The site's critics consensus reads: "Writer/director Adam Green has the beginnings of an inventive, frightening yarn in Frozen, but neither the script nor the cast are quite strong enough to truly do it justice." On Metacritic has a weighted average score of 43 out of 100, based on 16 critics, indicating "mixed or average reviews".

Critic Richard Roeper called the film "an entertaining, suspense-filled, sometimes wonderfully grotesque little scarefest", though The Hollywood Reporter commented that it "is not written, directed, or acted well enough to be a first-rate thriller".  Jeannette Catsoulis of The New York Times made it a NYT Critics' Pick and wrote, "A minimalist setup delivers maximum fright in Frozen, a nifty little chiller that balances its cold terrain with an unexpectedly warm heart."  Peter Debruge of Variety wrote, "Don’t be surprised if the movie’s most wince-inducing moments come not from the "disturbing images" (as the MPAA describes the sight of a leg bone sticking six inches out of one character's ski pants) but rather of the bad acting and worse dialogue."

Awards
It was nominated for a Saturn Award for Best Horror Film, losing to Drag Me to Hell.

References

External links

 
 
 
 
 

2010 films
2010 horror films
2010 horror thriller films
2010 independent films
2010s English-language films
2010s psychological horror films
2010 psychological thriller films
2010s sports films
2010s survival films
2000s disaster films
American horror thriller films
American independent films
American psychological horror films
American psychological thriller films
American skiing films
American sports drama films
American survival films
Films about death
Films directed by Adam Green
Films set in New England
Films shot in Utah
Snowboarding films
Films about wolves
2010s American films